Cosmetic may refer to:

Cosmetics, or make-up, substances to enhance the beauty of the human body, apart from simple cleaning
Cosmetic, an adjective describing beauty, aesthetics, or appearance, especially concerning the human body
Cosmetic, a topical product that is not a drug

See also
Cosmetic surgery
Cosmetic packaging
Conservation and restoration of vehicles (disambiguation), restoration work on a vehicle that improves its appearance rather than its functionality or structure
Cosmeceutical